Dmitry Sergeyevich Kovalyov (born 15 May 1982) is a former Russian handball player known for Chekhovskiye Medvedi and the Russian national team.

References

External links

1982 births
Living people
Russian male handball players
Sportspeople from Omsk
Olympic handball players of Russia
Handball players at the 2008 Summer Olympics